The XXV Army Corps was an infantry corps of the Royal Italian Army during World War I, the Italian invasion of Albania, and the Greco-Italian War and the subsequent Italian occupation of Greece during World War II.

History
The XXV Corps was first established in Mortegliano on 10 April 1917, until its disbandment on 5 January 1919.

On 24 October 1940, in preparation for the Italian invasion of Greece on the 28th, the Ciamuria Army Corps was activated in Italian-occupied Albania, with the 23rd Ferrara and 51st Siena infantry divisions and the Centauro Armoured Division. It was assigned the western (right) half of the Italian front, and on the start of the war advanced into Greek territory until it was stopped in the Battle of Elaia–Kalamas. Following the start of the Greek counteroffensive on the Italian left, covered by XXVI Army Corps, it was forced to retreat. On 17 November 1940 it was redesignated as XXV Army Corps. On 7 December it abandoned Argyrokastro, on 18 December Porto Palermo, and on 20 Himara. To shorten its front, the corps was assigned in mid-December to the sector around Mount Tomorr and the That e Progonat lines, where the Greek offensive was stopped.

On 20 January 1941 it launched spoiling attacks in the Aoös sector to relieve pressure on the Italian left, which was facing the final, unsuccessful Greek push towards Berat. In February, the corps was deployed from Shendeli to Kurvelesh, and opposed the Greek attacks in the Mount Trebeshinë–Mount Shëndelli area. On 8 March the corps was placed in defence of Tepeleni, while on the next day it took part in the unsuccessful Italian Spring Offensive (9–18 March). Following the German invasion of Greece on 6 April, the Italian forces in the Albanian front began their own advance against the retreating Greeks; the corps occupied Trebeshinë on 14 April and the Klisura Pass the next day, arriving at Derviçan and Argyrokastro on 19 April. After the Greek capitulation and the Axis occupation of Greece, the corps was disbanded on 31 July and its units transferred to XXVI Corps.

XXV Corps was reconstituted in Albania on 16 December 1941 with its seat at Valona. It comprised the 33rd Acqui and 49th Parma infantry divisions, in coastal defence and anti-partisan duties. The corps was disbanded on 12 September 1943 following the Italian armistice.

Commanders
 Generale di corpo d'armata Carlo Rossi (1940.12.10 – 1941.07.31) 
 Generale di divisione Alessandro Gloria (interim)  
 Generale di corpo d'armata Giovanni Vecchi (1941.12.05 – 1943.02.12)	
 Generale di corpo d'armata Umberto Mondino (1943.02.12 – 1943.09.08)

References

Army corps of Italy in World War I
Army corps of Italy in World War II
Albania in World War II
Italian military units and formations of the Greco-Italian War
Military units and formations established in 1940
Military units and formations disestablished in 1943